Randvere is a village in Saaremaa Parish, Saare County in western Estonia.

Before the administrative reform in 2017, the village was in Laimjala Parish.

It was the birthplace of philologist Johannes Aavik (1880–1973), a significant modernizator of the Estonian language.

References

Villages in Saare County
Kreis Ösel